The UNTV Cup Off Season: Clash of the Three (sometimes stylized as Clash of the Th3ee) was the 2014 off-season of the annual charity basketball league in the Philippines, UNTV Cup. The tournament was organized by UNTV Public Service channel, thru its chairman and chief executive officer of BMPI-UNTV, Kuya Daniel Razon, more popularly known as Mr. Public Service.

The Clash of the Three was a series of basketball games among the three branches of the Philippine Government namely: the Judiciary, the Legislative, and Executives teams. Non-earning point Media Team (Team ni Kuya) also play the off-season game to complete the set of players. The off-season game started on August 21, 2014 at Ynares Sports Arena, Pasig, Metro Manila, Philippines and ended its final games on October 14, 2014.

Team Judiciary won the tournament and donated ₱1 million to their chosen charity.

Teams 
 Executive Team (composed of Office of the President)
 Judiciary Team
 Legislative Team (composed of the House of Representatives and Senate)
 Media Team (Team ni Kuya)

Game Schedule

Winners and Beneficiaries 
The three teams represented their choice of charity institutions as beneficiaries for the game. One million pesos was given to the champion while first runner up team won one hundred thousand.

See also 
 UNTV Cup
 UNTV Public Service

References

External links 
 UNTVweb.com

Members Church of God International
2014 Philippine television series debuts
2014 in Philippine sport
UNTV Cup
UNTV (Philippines) original programming